Liliane Dévieux-Dehoux (Port-au-Prince, 29 December 1942) was a Haitian journalist and poet living in Quebec.

Life
She worked for Radio Canada since 1976 and as a researcher at the University of Montreal since 1982.

In 1977, she won the Prix littéraire des Caraïbes.

Works 
L'Amour, oui. La Mort, non, 1976.

References 

1942 births
Haitian journalists
Canadian journalists
Academics in Quebec
Haitian women poets
Canadian women poets
Haitian women journalists
Canadian women journalists
Living people